Westair Aviation Limited is a Namibian  aviation service provider and airline offering scheduled passenger services under the FlyNamibia brand as well as cargo and ACMI services based at Eros Airport in Windhoek.

History
In 1967, Westair Aviation began as an aircraft maintenance facility and has since became a passenger and freight aviation company. The airline has become a provider of ad-hoc as well as air chartered services in Namibia, providing long-term lease and aircraft maintenance services.  The airline also operates a variety of scheduled and unscheduled air cargo flights and has been offering a dedicated cargo service to DHL over the past 20 years.

In June 2005, Stimulus Investment Limited, a local Namibian investment company, acquired 29% of the total issued ordinary share of Westair Aviation, with the airline's management retaining 71% of the ordinary shares. Stimulus sold the shares back to Westair management in 2014 and is no longer a shareholder in Westair.

In November 2015, Westair Aviation acquired an Embraer ERJ-145 from LOT Polish Airlines. Named 'Tatekulu', this twinjet 50-seater was the first addition to the airlines' specialist fleet.

As of April 2018, the airline planned to expand its passenger route network to five scheduled destinations and six airports in two different countries in Southern Africa. In June 2019, the airline was granted designated carrier status by the Namibian Transport Commission. Scheduled local flights commenced on June 24, 2019 from its base at Eros Airport under the newly established brand name FlyWestair. FlyWestair rebranded as FlyNamibia on 2 November 2021. In September 2019, the airline revealed plans to commence its first international destination by starting flights from Eros Airport to Cape Town. In September 2022, Airlink a South African carrier based in Johannesburg, acquired a 40% equity share in FlyNamibia. The latter plans expansion to Ghana, Malawi, the DRC and Kenya after the demise of the Namibian flag-carries Air Namibia in 2021,

Fleet 

Westair Aviation's current fleet consist of over 30 aircraft. The aircraft suit relevant operations such as freight-transporting, crew rotations for mining operations and offering VIP charters to The Namibian government. Westair Aviation's fleet comprises Embraer, Beechcraft, Piper and Cessna aircraft with the Embraer ERJ-145 being their largest.

FlyNamibia Safari routes are serviced by a Reims-Cessna F406 Caravan II.

References

External links
Official website of Westair Aviation
Official website of FlyWestair

Airlines of Namibia
Airlines established in 1967